John Dunham States (16 June 1925 – 26 March 2015) was an orthopedic surgeon who dedicated his career to improving automotive safety. Born in Rochester, New York, he was a graduate of the University of Rochester, and received his M.D. from Harvard Medical School. He was a Professor of Orthopedic Surgery at the University of Rochester from 1976 to 1990.

His interest in automotive safety began when he served as race physician for the Watkins Glen International Speedway. As race physician, he learned the risks to the driver of being thrown from the car and the protection afforded by seat belts.

In 1966, he developed the first set of automobile safety standards.
In 1970, he developed an improved shoulder harness to restrain the upper body and prevent injuries that occur when the occupant hits the dashboard or windshield.

States drafted the New York State seat belt law in 1983, the first such law in the US. Similar laws have now been adopted in 49 states, and the National Highway Traffic Safety Administration credits these laws with dramatically increasing seat belt use and decreasing injuries and fatalities from traffic accidents.

States received the Distinguished Career Award from the Injury Control and Emergency Health Services Section of the American Public Health Association in 2000, the Excalibur Award from the National Motor Vehicle Safety Advisory Council and was cited for his work on public safety by Governor Mario Cuomo. He is a Fellow of the American College of Surgeons. He served as a member of the National Motor Vehicle Safety Advisory Council and chaired the New York State Department of Motor Vehicles Medical Advisory Board. He was also a visiting scientist at the Centers for Disease Control.

He was the author of 83 scientific publications and held a patent for an improved seat belt latch. He died in Rochester in 2015, aged 89.

References

External links 
 Sam Roberts: John D. States, Doctor Who Helped Create New York’s Seatbelt Law, Dies at 89. In: The New York Times, 1 April 2015

American orthopedic surgeons
American medical researchers
University of Rochester alumni
Harvard Medical School alumni
1925 births
2015 deaths
Seat belts